Zhang Xiaodong (born January 4, 1964) is a Chinese sailor. She won the silver medal in  Women's Windsurfer in  the 1992 Summer Olympics in Barcelona.

References

External links
 
 
 

1964 births
Living people
Chinese windsurfers
Female windsurfers
Chinese female sailors (sport)
Olympic sailors of China
Olympic medalists in sailing
Olympic silver medalists for China
Sailors at the 1992 Summer Olympics – Lechner A-390
Medalists at the 1992 Summer Olympics
Asian Games medalists in sailing
Asian Games gold medalists for China
Sailors at the 1990 Asian Games
Medalists at the 1990 Asian Games
20th-century Chinese women